A Team is a group of people or other animals linked in a common purpose.

Team or variants may also refer to:

Film, radio and television
 The Team (radio network), a Canadian sports radio network
 The Team (TV series), a television series in a number of African and Asian countries  
 The Team (2015 TV series), a 2015 European crime serial television series
 The Team (reality show), a reality show broadcast by Channel One Russia
 "The Team" (Agents of S.H.I.E.L.D.), an episode of the television series Agents of S.H.I.E.L.D.

Music
Bands
 Team (American band), an American indie rock band
 Team (Slovak band), a Slovak pop/rock music band
 The Team (group), an American hip hop group

Songs
 "Team" (Iggy Azalea song), 2016
 "Team" (Lorde song), 2013

Politics 
 The European Alliance of EU-critical Movements, a Eurosceptic alliance
 The Electors' Action Movement, a municipal political party in Vancouver, British Columbia
 The Emigration Action Movement, a political group that ran in the 1960 Cork City Council election

Other uses
 Team (horse), a racehorse
 River Team,  a tributary of the River Tyne in Gateshead, England
 Confederation of Thai Electrical Appliances, Electronic Automobile & Metalworkers, a trade union federation in Thailand
 European Health Insurance Card
 The Evangelical Alliance Mission, a Christian missionary organization
 TEAM Linhas Aéreas, a Brazilain airline
 Transmission Electron Aberration-Corrected Microscope, a research project

See also 
 Teem a lemon-lime-flavored soft drink
 TEAMS (disambiguation)